Georg Leber (7 October 1920 – 21 August 2012) was a German Trades Union leader and a politician in the Social Democratic Party of Germany (SPD).

Biography
Leber was born in Obertiefenbach (Beselich). After serving in the Luftwaffe (the German air force) in World War II, he joined the SPD in 1947. In 1957, he was elected to the Bundestag, which he was a member of until 1983, representing Frankfurt am Main I.

In 1966, Leber was appointed minister for transportation for the grand coalition.  He kept this position and became minister for postal service and long-distance communication under the joint SPD-FDP administration.  In 1972, he gave up both positions and became minister of defence. Under his ministership the Bundeswehr was expanded and the Universities of the Bundeswehr were founded in Munich and Hamburg. In 1978, he left his position after a controversy in the defense ministry involving eavesdropping. From 1979 until 1983 he was the Deputy Speaker of the Bundestag.

Leber quit politics in 1986, and with his wife retired to the Bavarian countryside. From 1990 to 1993, he was a member of the Advisory Board of the Bertelsmann Stiftung.

Leber died in his hometown of Schönau on 21 August 2012.

References

External links

1920 births
2012 deaths
People from Hesse-Nassau
Defence ministers of Germany
Transport ministers of Germany
Members of the Bundestag for Hesse
Members of the Bundestag 1980–1983
Members of the Bundestag 1976–1980
Members of the Bundestag 1972–1976
Members of the Bundestag 1969–1972
Members of the Bundestag 1965–1969
Members of the Bundestag 1961–1965
Members of the Bundestag 1957–1961
Grand Crosses 1st class of the Order of Merit of the Federal Republic of Germany
Luftwaffe personnel of World War II
Members of the Bundestag for the Social Democratic Party of Germany